Lemmetsa is a village in Audru Parish, Pärnu County, in southwestern Estonia. It is located just northeast of Audru, the administrative centre of the municipality, the city of Pärnu is located 8 km southeast. Lemmetsa has a population of 251 (as of 1 January 2011).

References

Villages in Pärnu County
Kreis Pernau